Bury Your Dead is a book written by Louise Penny and published by Minotaur Books (an imprint of St. Martin's Press, owned by Macmillan Publishers) on 28 September 2010, which later went on to win the Anthony Award for Best Novel in 2011.

Plot Intro 

Between The Brutal Telling and Bury Your Dead, there was a shooting of one of the agents in the homicide division (which is told in flashbacks).  While Gamache is doing research in Quebec City, a body is found in the sub-basement of a library. Gamache becomes a consultant of the investigation.  Meanwhile, the murder investigated in The Brutal Telling is investigated further.

References 

2010 Canadian novels
Novels by Louise Penny
Anthony Award-winning works
Novels set in Quebec
Quebec City in fiction
Minotaur Books books